KUXX (105.7 FM) is a radio station licensed to Jackson, Minnesota. The station broadcasts a country music format and is licensed to Community First Broadcasting, LLC.

References

External links
KUXX's website

Country radio stations in the United States
Radio stations in Minnesota
Radio stations established in 1994
1994 establishments in Minnesota